Nancy Becker-Kennedy (often credited without hyphen as Nancy Becker Kennedy) is a disability rights activist, writer, and actress best known for her television roles, including in Frasier, 3rd Rock from the Sun, The Louie Show, and General Hospital, where she played Martha McKee. She is the first person in a wheelchair to star as a series regular on both daytime and primetime television in the USA.

Career

Activism 
She is a member of the Southern California chapter of ADAPT, a group based in Denver known for forcefully pressing for the rights of the disabled and a contributing editor to New Mobility magazine.

Acting 
After college, she became a news producer for public television and later a published playwright, award-winning writer and composer. She is the first person in a wheelchair to star as a series regular in both daytime and primetime television in the United States - for General Hospital (playing the character Martha McKee) on ABC and The Louie Show on CBS. She also made guest appearances in TV shows like Frasier and 3rd Rock from the Sun. She has also appeared in the television movie Suddenly. Other roles include The Norm Show, MDs, and Equal Justice.

Her televised musical, Tell Them I'm a Mermaid, at the Mark Taper Forum Theatre in Los Angeles, California, was awarded the 1984 Media Award of the California Governor Committee for Employment of the Handicapped, Outstanding Corporate Contributions.

I Had To Break My Neck To Get Here is another autobiographical play she has toured.

Personal life 
She was born in Skokie, Illinois, and attended Knox College before transferring to State University of New York at Binghamton. She was injured in a diving accident at the age of 20 and became a quadriplegic. She holds a Masters's degree in communications.

References

External links 

21st-century American actresses
Actresses from Illinois
American people with disabilities
American television actresses
Knox College (Illinois) alumni
Binghamton University alumni
Living people
Year of birth missing (living people)